Valsot is a municipality in the Engiadina Bassa/Val Müstair Region in the canton of Graubünden in the extreme east of Switzerland. On 1 January 2013 the municipalities of Ramosch and Tschlin merged to form the new municipality of Valsot.

History

Ramosch
In 1956–58, on the hill Mottata (ca.  north-east of Ramosch), a significant prehistoric site was discovered. The Mottata site contains three settlement horizons, two from the mid and early Bronze Age (Laugen-Melaun/Luco-Meluno culture) and one from the early Iron Age (Fritzens-Sanzeno culture).

Tschlin

While Bronze and Iron Age items have been found in Tschlin, the first mention of the village is in the 10th century. In the 10th century, bishop Hildibald gave the chapterhouse in Chur a gift of a farm house in Tschlin. In the High Middle Ages Tschlin was under the authority of Ramosch. The village church of St. Blasius was built in 1515 in the gothic style. In 1545 the Protestant Reformation reached the village and in 1574–82 the reformer and historian Ulrich Campell worked in Tschlin. In 1856 a fire destroyed much of the village, including the Church of St. John the Baptist. The church was not rebuilt, but the church tower is still visible in the village.

Geography

 

Of this area, 32.7% is used for agricultural purposes, while 26.5% is forested. Of the rest of the land, 0.7% is settled (buildings or roads) and the remainder (40.1%) is non-productive (rivers, glaciers or mountains). It is along the left bank of the Inn river. It consists of the village of Ramosch and the village section of Vnà as well as the settlements of Raschvella and Seraplana. Until 1943 Ramosch was known as Remüs.

Of this area, 28.7% is used for agricultural purposes, while 34.7% is forested. Of the rest of the land, 1.3% is settled (buildings or roads) and the remainder (35.3%) is non-productive (rivers, glaciers or mountains). It consists of the village of Tschlin on a terrace above the left bank of the Inn, the sections of Strada and Martina and the hamlets of San Niclà, Chaflur, Sclamischot and Vinadi. Until 1943 Tschlin was known as Schleins.

Demographics

Historic population
The historical population is given in the following chart:

Languages
Most of the population in Ramosch speaks Romansh (84.1%), with German being second most common (13.9%) and Dutch being third (1.1%).

Ramosch

Tschlin
Most of the population of Tschlin speaks Romansh (71.4%), with German being second most common (25.5%) and italian being third (1.0%).

Heritage sites of national significance
Tschanüff Castle, the Mottata (a prehistoric settlement) and the Swiss Reformed Church of St. Florinus in Ramosch and the Museum Stamparia da Strada in Tschlin are listed as Swiss heritage sites of national significance.

References

 
Cultural property of national significance in Graubünden